Nefta Football Club is a 2018 live action short film directed by French director Yves Piat. It has been selected and awarded at several film festivals including Clermont-Ferrand International Short Film Festival, Palm Springs International Film Festival as well as Aspen Shortsfest, where it won the Oscar Qualifying Jury Award for Comedy.

In January 2020 it was nominated for the 2020 Academy Award for Best Live Action Short Film and the 2020 César Award for Best Short Film.

Plot 
In a Tunisian village, children are playing football on a wasteland. Meanwhile, Abdallah and Mohammed come across a donkey with headphones on its ears and bags full of white powder on its back. The two young brothers decide to bring those bags back to their village.

Awards 
Since its launch, the film has been selected in nearly 100 festivals around the world and has received more than 65 awards.

References

External links 

 
 
 

2018 films
French comedy short films
2010s French films